Hureaulite is a manganese phosphate with the formula .  It was discovered in 1825 and named in 1826 for the type locality, Les Hureaux, Saint-Sylvestre, Haute-Vienne, Limousin, France.  It is sometimes written as huréaulite, but the IMA does not recommend this for English language text.

A complete series exists from lithiophilite,  to triphylite, including hureaulite, strengite, stewartite, and sicklerite, .

Environment
Hureaulite is a secondary mineral occurring in granite pegmatites.  At the type locality it occurs in a zone of altered triphylite, in pegmatite. Typically occurs very late in the sequence of formation of secondary phosphate minerals.  Associated at the type locality with vivianite, ; rockbridgeite, ; heterosite,  and cacoxenite, . It can be synthesised; most natural hureaulites are Mn-rich compounds but extensive solution is known for synthetic material.

Localities
The type locality is Les Hureaux, Saint-Sylvestre, Haute-Vienne, Limousin, France. Hureaulite is also found in a granite pegmatite known for its phosphates in the Aimorés pegmatite district, at the Cigana claim in Galiléia, Doce valley, Minas Gerais, Brazil, formerly known as the Jocão Mine.

References

Manganese(II) minerals
Phosphate minerals
Monoclinic minerals
Minerals in space group 15